László Palácsik (22 May 1959 – 27 January 2022) was a Hungarian biathlete. He competed in the 20 km individual event at the 1984 Winter Olympics. 

Palácsik died from heart disease on 27 January 2022, at the age of 62.

References

External links

1959 births
2022 deaths
Biathletes at the 1984 Winter Olympics
Hungarian male biathletes
Olympic biathletes of Hungary
Sportspeople from Miskolc